Lewis S. Bailey was a member of the Wisconsin State Assembly.

Biography
Bailey was born on December 26, 1842, in Greenfield, New York. During the American Civil War, he served with the 115th New York Infantry of the Union Army, originally as an enlisted man and later as an officer. Later, he was chief of the fire department of Oconto, Wisconsin. Bailey died on October 7, 1903.

Political career
Bailey was elected to the Assembly in 1890. Other positions he held include county judge of Oconto County, Wisconsin and justice of the peace. He was a Democrat.

References

External links
The Political Graveyard

People from Greenfield, New York
People from Oconto, Wisconsin
Democratic Party members of the Wisconsin State Assembly
Wisconsin state court judges
County judges in the United States
American justices of the peace
American fire chiefs
Union Army officers
Union Army soldiers
People of New York (state) in the American Civil War
1842 births
1903 deaths
Burials in Wisconsin
19th-century American politicians
19th-century American judges
Military personnel from Wisconsin